Sheema Kalbasi (born 20 November 1972, in Tehran, Iran) is an Iranian-born American poet and writer on issues of feminism, war, refugees, human rights, a filmmaker on women’s issues, Sharia Law, freedom of expression and an activist for women's rights, minorities rights, children's rights, human rights and refugees' rights. She grew up in Pakistan and Denmark, and now lives in the United States.

Biography
Sheema taught refugee children and  worked for the UNHCR and the Center for Refugees in Pakistan, and UNA Denmark.

In 2009 she signed an open letter of apology posted to Iranian.com along with 266 other Iranian academics, writers, artists, journalists about the persecution of Baháʼís.
Her poems have been anthologized and translated into more than 20 languages. In 2012, LGen the Hon. Roméo Dallaire, Senator from Quebec, Canada, closed his speech on the situation in Iran with sections from Kalbasi's poem Hezbollah. A winner of Harvest International, the poem has also been anthologized and published amongst others in The Forbidden: Poems from Iran and its Exiles, the Atlanta Review, and Iranian and Diasporic Literature in the 21st Century: A Critical Study by Dr. Daniel Grassian. In 2008 her poem The Passenger was selected and performed at Tribute World Trade Center, NY. Her poems  Possession and Dancing Tango were set to music as an art song for mezzo-soprano and piano and performed at Old Dominion University, Virginia. in 2016.

Books
 The Poetry of Iranian Women (Editor, Reelcontent Publishing, 2008)
 Seven Valleys of Love, a bilingual anthology of women poets from Middle Ages Persia to present-day Iran (Translator, Editor, PRA Publishing, 2008)
 Echoes in Exile (PRA Publishing, 2006)
 Sangsar (The Stoning, Sinbad Publishing, 2005)

Filmography

Awards
 Human Rights Award and Recognition, Center for Refugees, UNHCR, Islamabad, Pakistan
 Hezbollah, from Echoes in Exile, Best Poem, Harvest International.
 The Passenger, Third place, Jersey works.

Nominations
 Echoes in Exile, Collection, Annual Library of Virginia Literary Award, 2008.
 Echoes in Exile, Pushcart Prize, 2008.
 Seven Valleys of Love, The PEN Award for Poetry In Translation, 2008.
 Seven Valleys of Love, Anisfield-Wolf Book Award, 2008.

See also

List of Iranian women

References

External links
 
 Tehelka Interview
 The Diplomat Interview
 Take Part Interview
 Sheema Kalbasi, ICORN
 The Other Voices International Project

Iranian women writers
20th-century Iranian poets
Iranian women activists
Iranian women's rights activists
Iranian human rights activists
21st-century Iranian poets